The 1st Military Working Dog Regiment, Royal Army Veterinary Corps is a British Army animal unit. It is responsible for providing trained dogs and handlers to support the main brigade of British troops deployed to Afghanistan in Operation Herrick. The regiment was formed on 26 March 2010, and its headquarters is located at St George's Barracks, North Luffenham.

Composition
The 1st Military Working Dog Regiment was established to command the Army's five military working dog support units. Until the regimental headquarters had been established these units were independent. As part of forming the regiment, an additional 162 soldiers were assigned to the RAVC. As of 2015 the regiment comprised 299 regular soldiers and up to 384 working dogs. At this time 350 reservists were being integrated into the regiment.

As of 2011, the regiment comprised the following sub-units:
Regimental Headquarters St George's Barracks, North Luffenham.
101 Military Working Dog Squadron St George's Barracks, North Luffenham. (Nationally recruited Army Reserves)
102 Military Working Dog Squadron St George's Barracks, North Luffenham.
103 HQ & Support Military Working Dog Squadron St George's Barracks, North Luffenham.
104 Military Working Dog Squadron St George's Barracks, North Luffenham.
105 Military Working Dog Squadron St George's Barracks, North Luffenham.
106 Cyprus Military Working Dog Troop Episkopi, now re-rolled under 103 HQ & Support Squadron (2018)

See also
Dogs in warfare

References

External links
 https://www.army.mod.uk/who-we-are/corps-regiments-and-units/army-medical-services/royal-army-veterinary-corps/1st-military-working-dog-regiment/
 https://www.army.mod.uk/who-we-are/corps-regiments-and-units/army-medical-services/royal-army-veterinary-corps/
 https://www.army.mod.uk/who-we-are/corps-regiments-and-units/army-medical-services/royal-army-veterinary-corps/defence-animal-training-regiment/
Military Working Dog
Dogs in warfare
Military Working Dog
Military units and formations established in 2010
2010 establishments in the United Kingdom
Dogs in the United Kingdom